Gattini – Selezione orchestrale di classici nostri belli is a compilation album by Italian rock band Elio e le Storie Tese, published in 2009.

It features orchestral versions of previous songs and unpublished one, "Storia di un bellimbusto".

The CD has been released together with a DVD featuring the making of "Gattini" and "Storia di un bellimbusto" and the videoclip of the latter.

Track listing
"Gattini" – 0:33
"John Holmes (Una vita per il cinema)" – 3:54
"Cassonetto differenziato per il frutto del peccato" – 4:08
"Nella vecchia azienda agricola" – 1:14
"Pork & Cindy" – 5:00
"Il vitello dai piedi di balsa" – 3:14
"Il vitello dai piedi di balsa (reprise)" – 1:33
"Uomini col borsello (Ragazza che limoni sola)" – 4:29
"Essere donna oggi" – 7:18
"La terra dei cachi" – 4:09
"Psichedelia" – 4:19
"Il rock and roll" – 5:41
"La follia della donna (Parte I)" – 3:35
"Shpalman®" – 3:33
"Largo al factotum" – 4:53
"Storia di un bellimbusto" – 5:25
"Shpalman® (Romanza da salotto)" – 5:54

Charts

References

Further reading

External links

2009 albums
Elio e le Storie Tese albums
Italian-language albums